The Russian Church, Geneva (French: Cathédrale de l'Exaltation de la Sainte Croix, Cathedral of the Exaltation of the Holy Cross) is a historic Russian Orthodox church in Geneva, Switzerland.

Grand Duchess Anna Fyodorovna, who resided in Bern and Geneva after she chose to separate from Grand Duke Constantine, gave funds to build the church in 1863. It was designed by David Grimm of the Imperial Academy of Arts and completed in 1866 in the fashionable Les Tranchées neighborhood of Geneva.  The Russian revival church, with its Byzantine striped arches and gold onion domes, underwent restoration in 1966.  The church remains in active use.

References

External links
 

Churches in Geneva
Russian Orthodox church buildings
19th-century Russian Orthodox church buildings
Churches completed in 1863
Russian Revival architecture
Eastern Orthodoxy in Switzerland
19th-century churches in Switzerland